Ken Harris may refer to:

Ken Harris, an American animator
Ken Harris (politician), who served in Baltimore, Maryland
Kenneth R. Harris, a politician who served in Charlotte, North Carolina